Robotech music consists of the musical scores written for the original 1985 Robotech television series and its various sequels and spinoffs, including Robotech video games. The recognizable original themes were composed by Ulpio Minucci and orchestrated by Arlon Ober. Other composers include:
 Michael Bradley
 Julian Costas (Composer/Singer) aka Claudio Costa (NAS/SGA Award Winning Composer)
 Scott Glasgow
 Jack Goga
 Jesper Kyd
 Randall Rumage
 Steve Wittmack
 Marcia Woods
 Alberto Estevez

Soundtrack releases

Music of the TV Series "Robotech"
Released only in France as "Musique Originale De La Serié T.V. "Robotech"" (translated from French to "Original Music of the T.V. Series "Robotech"") for the French broadcast of the Robotech TV series.

Robotech: BGM Collection, Vol.1

This vinyl record from U.S. Renditions was the only LP release of the Robotech soundtrack in North America. The track selection represented only a small portion of the Robotech musical score from the original television series since additional volumes were never released. This album was the first domestic anime product of U.S. Renditions as well as the first ever American anime BGM album. The album was produced by David Keith Riddick who was a founding member of U.S. Renditions.

Track Listing

Robotech: Perfect Collection

This single CD from U.S. Renditions was the first digital release of the Robotech soundtrack. This was the first American anime BGM (Background Music) soundtrack to be released in the Compact Disc format. This release included tracks that were missing from the earlier vinyl album release. Due to budgetary constraints, the track selection remained incomplete.

Track Listing

Robotech: The Movie Soundtrack
Released only in France and Latin America as "Bande Originale Du Film Robotech" (translated from French to "Robotech: The Movie Original Soundtrack") for the rarely seen Robotech: The Movie, the various records, cassettes, and discs of this soundtrack are now considered collectors' items. Michael Bradley's single of Robotech The Movie: Underground was also released separately by Carrere Records.

Robotech: Perfect Soundtrack Album

This double CD set from Streamline Pictures is also known as the Tenth Anniversary Soundtrack and represented the first attempt to digitally restore up the music and gather as many tracks as possible from the original television series into a single collection along with some additional tracks from Robotech: The Movie and Robotech II: The Sentinels.

Track Listing

Robotech: Battlecry Soundtrack

This CD from TDK Mediactive featured music from the Robotech: Battlecry video game that drew on Ulpio Minucci and Arlon Ober's original themes, but was limited to playback from synthesized instruments. It was bundled as part of special edition box sets of the game.

Track Listing

Robotech: Invasion Soundtrack

This CD from Sumthing Else Music Works was composed by notable game composer Jesper Kyd for the Robotech: Invasion video game, but featured music that was very different in style and tone from previous Robotech music.

Kyd's thinking on the score: {{cquote|I had seen Robotech in the 80's and remembered the awesome storyline and visuals. I was asked to write a completely new score for Robotech: Invasion and NOT use the original 1980s music as an inspiration. So while I did watch quite a bit of Robotech to get familiar with the franchise again, I didn’t pay too much attention to the TV show soundtrack. I read a lot of Robotech comics, especially the Robotech: Invasion series, because of the close relations these comic books had with the game.|}}

Track Listing

Robotech: 20th Anniversary Soundtrack

Released at the end of 2005, this double CD set from Harmony Gold USA is also known as the Twentieth Anniversary Soundtrack. Some of the music was cleaned up further over the previous tenth anniversary release and includes 7 more tracks than before. A variant was released in summer 2006 in which a stereo effect was simulated on tracks that were originally recorded in mono.

Track Listing

Robotech: The Shadow Chronicles Soundtrack

Completed in 2006, composer Scott Glasgow recorded the music for the Robotech: The Shadow Chronicles'' movie with the Prague Symphony Orchestra, utilizing some of the original theme music by Ulpio Minucci. A CD soundtrack was released by Varèse Sarabande on February 13, 2007.

Track Listing

Robotech: 30th Anniversary Soundtrack

Track Listing

References

External links
 Robotech.com introduction to soundtracks

Robotech
Anime soundtracks